Lake Yahola is a reservoir in Tulsa, Oklahoma. The reservoir was completed in 1924. Its primary purpose is to store raw water for treatment and distribution. This city-owned, concrete-lined lake is an integral part of the Tulsa water supply, and receives water by pipeline from Lake Spavinaw. It is located in Mohawk Park, adjacent to the Mohawk Water Treatment Plant.

Lake description

The original water treatment plant, designed to process 90 million gallons per day (MGD), went into service in 1929. It was replaced in 1998 by a new plant designed to process 100 MGD. The Mohawk plant has been expanded to a design capacity of 200 MGD

Recreation
Lake Yahola also serves as a recreation site, with facilities for boating and fishing. However, the Oklahoma Department of Wildlife Conservation states that the docks are closed to the public and that boating is not allowed. Fishing from sites along the shore is allowed.

The adjacent Oxley Nature Center is a popular place for bird watching.

References

Yahola
Protected areas of Tulsa County, Oklahoma
Infrastructure completed in 1924
Yahola
1924 establishments in Oklahoma